Leucaena matudae is an endangered species of plant in the family Fabaceae. It is found only in Mexico.

References

matudae
Endemic flora of Mexico
Endangered plants
Endangered biota of Mexico
Taxonomy articles created by Polbot